Charles M. Turbiville (July 13, 1943 – October 20, 2018) was an American politician, Vietnam combat veteran and member of the South Dakota House of Representatives from 2005-2013 and 2017-2018, as well as the mayor of Deadwood, South Dakota.

Background
Turbiville was born in Buffalo, South Dakota. He graduated from Newell High School in Newell, South Dakota. Turbiville went to the University of South Dakota and Black Hills State University. Turbiville served in the United States Army from 1967 to 1969 and was a commissioned a second lieutenant. He was honorably discharged as a first lieutenant after having received two Silver Stars and a Bronze Star for his actions in Vietnam. He was a farmer and owned his parents farm in Newell, South Dakota. He served on the Newell School Board. Turbiville served as director of economic development for Deadwood, South Dakota. From 2013 to 2016, Turbiville served on the South Dakota Lottery Commission.

Political career
Turbiville served as mayor of Deadwood, South Dakota from 2013 until his death. He also served as a Republican member for the 31st district in the South Dakota House of Representatives from 2005 to 2013, and again starting from 2017 until his death on October 20, 2018. He died at his home in Deadwood, South Dakota. He was reelected to his state house seat on November 6, two and a half weeks after his death, which will be filled by an appointee of the Governor of South Dakota.

Turbiville was interred at Black Hills National Cemetery.

References

External links
 City of Deadwood biography

1943 births
2018 deaths
People from Harding County, South Dakota
University of South Dakota alumni
Black Hills State University alumni
Military personnel from South Dakota
United States Army personnel of the Vietnam War
Recipients of the Silver Star
People from Deadwood, South Dakota
People from Butte County, South Dakota
Businesspeople from South Dakota
Farmers from South Dakota
School board members in South Dakota
Mayors of places in South Dakota
Republican Party members of the South Dakota House of Representatives
21st-century American politicians
Politicians elected posthumously
20th-century American businesspeople